Potent potables may refer to:

Alcoholic beverages
A recurring category on the game show Jeopardy! and on the Saturday Night Live skit Celebrity Jeopardy!